Abraham of Ephesus was a 6th-century Archbishop of Ephesus in the Byzantine Empire, and monastery founder. He is venerated as a saint by both the Catholic and the Orthodox Churches. His feast day is 28 October.

His legacy 
During his life as bishop he played an important role in the foundation of a monastery in Constantinople and another in Jerusalem.

Two homilies, important for the knowledge and understanding of the ancient Byzantine liturgy, have reached us: One on the feast of the Annunciation and one on the feast of the Presentation of Jesus at the Temple.

References 

6th-century Byzantine bishops
6th-century Christian saints
Bishops of Ephesus
Byzantine saints of the Eastern Orthodox Church